Compass Point is an album released by country musician David Allan Coe. It was released in 1979 on Columbia.

Recording
Coe closed out the decade with his ninth album for Columbia.  The songs, all Coe originals, sequence into the next, which was becoming a hallmark on his records.  It was produced again by the team of Ron Bledsoe and Billy Sherrill.  Thom Jurek of AllMusic contends, “With Bledsoe's gritty, in-your-face, performance-based approach and Sherrill's polish and sense of space and texture, they were able to balance all of the inherent contradictions in Coe's music, from the gorgeous balladry of ‘Gone,’ ‘Heads or Tails,’ and the elaborately arranged dark honky tonk of ‘Merle and Me’ (not Haggard) to the rocking bluegrass stomp of ‘Honey Don't’ and the boozy Tex-Mex swagger of ‘Lost.’”

Musically, several of the songs on Compass Point look to the Caribbean, with shuffling back-beats and breezy rhythms, such as on “Loving Her (Will Make You Lose Your Mind)” and the tongue-twisting closing track.  Lyrically, Coe covers some of his favourite themes, such as crime and prison on “Three Time Loser” and “Merle and Me,” tunes that echo Coe’s own youth spent in jail and youth reformatories.   “Honey Don’t” sounds like Coe striking back at anyone who would dare question his musical credentials (“I’ve been a roadie for Satan, honey/I was the sound man for the Devil…”) and includes the repeated line “Honey don’t you pull that shit on me,” a rare expletive on a major label country record at the time.  Opener “Heads or Tails” ruminates on the chance nature of romance, with Coe singing the title in a Johnny Cash drawl.

Reception
AllMusic: "As a coda to a decade that went by in a blur of fame, success, madness, tragedy, and disappointment, Coe left it on a very high note with an album that looked brightly to the future."

Track listing
All Songs written by David Allan Coe.

"Heads or Tails" – 2:04
"3 Time Loser" – 2:05
"Gone (Like)" – 6:26
"Honey Don't" – 2:54
"Lost" – 3:33
"Merle and Me" – 3:39
"Loving Her (Will Make You Lose Your Mind)" – 1:54
"The Fish Aren't Bitin' Today" – 3:08
"X's and O's (Kisses and Hugs)" – 3:46

Personnel
 David Allan Coe – vocals
 Wesley Taylor, Mike Barton – guitar
 Dale Seigfreid – steel guitar
 Alan Hicks – bass
 Skeet Petty – drums
 George Heard – harmonica
 Billy Sherrill, Ron Bledsoe – producer

References

David Allan Coe albums
1979 albums
Albums produced by Billy Sherrill
Columbia Records albums